Joan Bray (born September 16, 1945) is a former teacher, journalist, and union leader. She was a Democratic member of both the Missouri House of Representatives (1993–2002) and Missouri State Senate (2003–2010). She resides with her husband, Carl Hoagland, in St. Louis, Missouri.  She has two children, Noel and Kolby.

Bray was born in Lubbock, Texas, and graduated from Southwestern University with a B.A. in English, and from the University of Massachusetts Amherst with a C.A.G.S.  She was a teacher in Colorado and Massachusetts. She has also was a journalist with the San Antonio Express-News and St. Louis Post-Dispatch, during which time she served as vice-president of the Newspaper Guild's Local 49.

Bray was first elected to the Missouri House of Representatives in 1992, and served in that body through 2002, when she was elected to the Missouri State Senate. She was term-limited out in 2010, when she was replaced by Republican John Lamping.

In the Senate, she served on the following committees:
Appropriations
Commerce, Consumer Protection, Energy and the Environment
Rules, Joint Rules, Resolutions and Ethics
Transportation
Ways and Means
Joint Committee on MO Health Net
Joint Committee on Transportation Oversight
Joint Committee on Tax Policy

Bray was appointed interim executive director of Consumers Council of Missouri in March 2013.

References

External links
Missouri Senate - Joan Bray Archived Missouri Senate website
 
Follow the Money - Joan Bray
2008 2006 2004 2002 Missouri Senate campaign contributions
2000 1998 Missouri House campaign contributions

1945 births
Living people
American women columnists
American trade union leaders
Democratic Party members of the Missouri House of Representatives
Democratic Party Missouri state senators
People from Colorado
People from Lubbock, Texas
Politicians from St. Louis
Southwestern University alumni
University of Massachusetts Amherst alumni
Women state legislators in Missouri
St. Louis Post-Dispatch people
Journalists from Texas
Activists from Texas
21st-century American women